Kim Young-sik (born 1953) is a Seoul engraver of Oriental seals who impersonates North Korean leader Kim Jong-il. Ever since his sister-in-law teased the businessman's sagging form as a likeness to the chairman, Kim Young-sik has portrayed Kim Jong-il at every opportunity, in movies, television shows, commercials, and for personal appearances. "When someone tells me I don't resemble Kim Jong-il in certain respects, I'm unhappy," said Kim in The Korea Times. Unlike his more cosmetically enhanced competitor Bae Eun-sik, "I am a natural," Kim told the Los Angeles Times. "I didn't have to perm my hair. I didn't need plastic surgery. Even my family name, Kim, didn't have to be changed. Sometimes I feel like I am Kim Jong-il." Kim, whose stated goal is to have the leader say, "Little Brother, come and see me," affirms, "I wouldn't want Kim Jong-il to be offended by anything I do. I don't want to portray him as an evil person."

References
 The Korea Times interview May 9, 2006
 The Los Angeles Times interview June 11, 2006

External links

South Korean male film actors
Living people
1953 births